Rob Phillis (born 27 April 1956) is a retired motorcycle road racer from Australia. He began his motorcycling career competing in dirt bike and motocross events before crossing over to road racing in 1974. He won the Australian Superbike and Australian Endurance title in 1987 and also won the Australian 1000cc title in 1989 riding a ZXR750 Kawasaki winning himself a sponsorship from Team Kawasaki Australia in the  Superbike World Championship.

In his career, he totalled 4 wins, 23 other podiums, 3 poles and 6 fastest laps. He remained close friends with Aaron Slight, his teammate at the time, and was Slight's first visitor following his near-fatal brain problem in 2000. Phillis retired from top-level racing in 1998 at the age of 42.

References

External links
 Rob Phillis profile

1956 births
Living people
Australian motorcycle racers
Superbike World Championship riders